Maulana Syed Nasib Ali Shah was a Pakistani politician who served as members of the 12th National Assembly of Pakistan from 16 November 2002 – until his death 22 January 2007.

References

2007 deaths
Pakistani Islamic religious leaders
Pakistani Sunni Muslims
People from Bannu District
Pakistani MNAs 2002–2007
Jamiat Ulema-e-Islam (F) politicians